Banský Studenec is a village and municipality in Banská Štiavnica District, in the Banská Bystrica Region of Slovakia.

History
In historical records, the village was first mentioned in 1266  (Kulpach) as a German settlement. It belonged to Banská Bystrica.

Genealogical resources

The records for genealogical research are available at the state archive "Statny Archiv in Banska Bystrica, Slovakia"

 Roman Catholic church records (births/marriages/deaths): 1788-1897 (parish A)

See also
 List of municipalities and towns in Slovakia

External links
https://web.archive.org/web/20070513023228/http://www.statistics.sk/mosmis/eng/run.html
http://www.e-obce.sk/obec/banskystudenec/bansky-studenec.html
https://www.banskystudenec.sk/
Surnames of living people in Bansky Studenec

Villages and municipalities in Banská Štiavnica District